Mihalik, Mihálik is a gender-neutral Slavic surname that may refer to
Adam Mihálik (born 2000), Slovak footballer
Brian Mihalik (born 1992), American football offensive tackle 
Brenda G.Mihalik Mathieu (born 1963) Slovakian Sage and Poet
Cora-Ann Mihalik (born c. 1954), American television news anchor and reporter 
Emil John Mihalik (1920–1984), American Catholic bishops
Enikő Mihalik (born 1987), Hungarian model
George Mihalik (born 1952), American football coach and former player
Jaroslav Mihalík (born 1994), Slovak football winger
Kálmán Mihalik (1896–1922), Hungarian physician and composer
Lukáš Mihálik (footballer, born 1994), Slovak football forward 
Lukáš Mihálik (footballer, born 1997), Slovak football midfielder
Ondřej Mihálik (born 1997), Czech football striker 
Pavol Mihalik, Slovak ice hockey player
Peter Mihálik
Red Mihalik (1916–1996), American basketball player and referee of Polish descent
Roman Mihálik (born 1988), Slovak football defender 
Vladimír Mihálik (born 1987), Slovak ice hockey defenceman

Other
 Michalík

Slovak-language surnames